The border between Mozambique and South Africa is divided into two segments, separated by the kingdom of Eswatini.

Geography
The tripoint with Zimbabwe is located at Crooks' Corner, in the Limpopo River either at or very close to its confluence with the Luvuvhu River. The border runs in a straight line from this tripoint to the Shingwedzi River, and then along a series of straight lines joining beacons generally along the top of the eastern slope of the Lebombo Mountains. It crosses the Olifants, Sabie and Komati rivers. This segment of the border terminates at the northern Eswatini tripoint at Mpundweni Beacon near Namaacha.

The southern Eswatini tripoint is situated at Abercorn Drift in the Usutu River (Maputo River), where the Mozambique–Eswatini border along the Lebombo Mountains meets the river. From here the border follows the Usuthu to its former confluence with the Pongola River; the location of the confluence has changed since the border was demarcated. The border then runs in an easterly direction along straight lines joining beacons generally at the same latitude as the Usutu-Pongola confluence (approximately 26° 52′ South). It meets the Indian Ocean below Monte Ouro peak, just to the south of Ponta do Ouro.

Crossings
There are four official border crossings, three in the northern segment and one in the southern segment. The main crossing is Ressano Garcia/Lebombo where the Maputo Corridor highway and railway cross the border. The crossings are listed from north to south in the table below. The Mozambican and South African Governments announced on the 18th of March 2018 that the Ressano Garcia border would open 24 hours starting in April of that same year

References

 
Borders of South Africa
International borders
South Africa